Yuliya Zhuravok (born in Khoten, Sumy Oblast, Ukraine, on 10 November 1994) is a Ukrainian biathlete. She became junior world champion in 2015, and represented Ukraine at the Biathlon World Championships 2015 in Kontiolahti. She represented Ukraine at the 2012 Winter Youth Olympics in Innsbruck, Austria, where she was 18th in sprint and 8th in pursuit. Zhuravok participated at 2015 World Championships where she was 28th in individual.

Performances

World Championships

World Cup

Rankings

IBU Cup

Individual podiums

Relay podiums

References

External links
Zhuravok's profile at biathlon.co.ua

1994 births
Living people
Ukrainian female biathletes
Biathletes at the 2012 Winter Youth Olympics